The 1994–95 BHL season was the 13th season of the British Hockey League, the top level of ice hockey in Great Britain. 12 teams participated in the league, and the Sheffield Steelers won the league title by finishing first in the regular season. They also won the playoff championship.

Regular season

Playoffs

Group A

Group B

Semifinals
Sheffield Steelers 7-5 (SO) Cardiff Devils
Edinburgh Racers 11-7 Nottingham Panthers

Final
Sheffield Steelers 7-2 Edinburgh Racers

References

External links
Season on hockeyarchives.info

1
United
British Hockey League seasons